Opus 24: Rome, from the Campagna, Sunset is an 1867 oil painting on canvas by Thomas Moran.

References

1867 paintings
Paintings in the collection of the Timken Museum of Art